The Team EP (stylized as The TEAM ep) is an extended play (EP) by American alternative rock band Local H. The Team EP is the first Local H release to feature drummer Ryan Harding, who joined the band in November 2013, and was initially sold exclusively at Local H concerts. Limited copies have since been made available online from G&P Records, the band's official merchandiser.

Single

The Team EP includes the single "Team," which was released on April 21, 2014. "Team" is a cover of a song originally recorded by New Zealand singer-songwriter Lorde for her debut studio album Pure Heroine (2013). The Local H version is also featured on Local H's Awesome Mix Tape 2, which was released on December 16, 2014.

Track listing

Personnel
Scott Lucas – vocals, guitar, bass
Ryan Harding – drums

References

External links
 The Team EP at G&P Records

2014 EPs
Local H EPs
Self-released EPs